Federico Rasmussen (born 4 March 1992) is an Argentine professional footballer who plays as a centre-back for Sarmiento.

Club career
Rasmussen's first club was Independiente de Dorrego, who he left for Lanús in 2007. He didn't play, though did spend a season out on loan with Flandria in 2013–14; where he made nine appearances in Primera B Metropolitana. January 2015 saw Rasmussen complete a move to Tiro Federal (BB) of Torneo Federal A. He made his debut on 22 March against Alianza, before scoring his first senior goal in June versus Deportivo Madryn. He stayed in tier three with Mitre in January 2016 but soon left to rejoin Independiente de Dorrego. In mid-2016, Rasmussen moved to Villa Mitre. One goal and twenty-three came.

Guillermo Brown signed Rasmussen in August 2017. His bow came against ex-club Mitre in the following December. On 6 June 2019, Rasmussen agreed a move abroad for the first time after penning loan terms with Ascenso MX side Atlante. He debuted during a goalless draw at home to Mineros de Zacatecas on 2 August, which preceded a further twenty-four appearances; he also scored once, in a win over Leones Negros on 27 September. On 18 June 2020, Rasmussen headed out on loan to Liga MX club Querétaro. However, due to foreign player limits, he quickly returned to his parent club.

At the end of July 2021, Rasmussen joined Sarmiento.

International career
In 2009, Rasmussen was called up to represent Argentina at the FIFA U-17 World Cup in Nigeria. He won two caps at the tournament versus the hosts and continent counterparts Colombia; who eliminated them. He played for the U20s in December 2012. Sansinena

Career statistics
.

References

External links

1992 births
Living people
Sportspeople from Buenos Aires Province
Argentine footballers
Argentina youth international footballers
Argentina under-20 international footballers
Association football defenders
Argentine expatriate footballers
Primera B Metropolitana players
Torneo Federal A players
Primera Nacional players
Ascenso MX players
Club Atlético Lanús footballers
Flandria footballers
Club Atlético Mitre footballers
Villa Mitre footballers
Guillermo Brown footballers
Atlante F.C. footballers
Querétaro F.C. footballers
Club Atlético Sarmiento footballers
Expatriate footballers in Mexico
Argentine expatriate sportspeople in Mexico
Argentine people of Danish descent